With Fear I Kiss the Burning Darkness is the second studio album by the Swedish death metal band At the Gates. It was re-released in 1993 with The Red in the Sky Is Ours and again in 2003 with bonus tracks. This would be the last album with guitarist Alf Svensson who left the band after its release.

Background information
Anders Björler, the guitarist, described With Fear I Kiss the Burning Darkness as At the Gates' "darkest album", and deemed the album's production as "heavier" than the group's previous work.

Tomas Lindberg, the vocalist, said of the album cover: "The cover [...] is probably my favorite. It is a piece of art made by Swedish author/artist/composer Åke Hodell. The piece is called 220 Volt Buddha. Åke approved for us to use it for free, after inquiring about the music of the band and our approach, as soon as he understood that we were a non-commercial act. He has composed several pieces of abstract music, written radio plays and novels. You could consider him a modernist along the lines of Vladimir Mayakovsky. It was an honour for me to work with him and I think the blue tone matches the abstract music on the album perfectly. Åke died in 2000. He is greatly missed."

Track listing

Personnel

At the Gates
Anders Björler − guitar
Jonas Björler − bass guitar
Adrian Erlandsson − drums
Alf Svensson − guitar
Tomas Lindberg − vocals

Additional personnel
Matti Kärki − vocals on "Ever-Opening Flower"
Åke Hodell − artwork
Noel Summerville − mastering
Eric Gunewall − photography
Tomas Skogsberg − production
Fred Estby, Lars Linden, Tomas Skogsberg − recording

References

At the Gates albums
1993 albums
Peaceville Records albums